The men's shot put event was part of the track and field athletics programme at the 1924 Summer Olympics. The competition was held on Tuesday, July 8, 1924. 28 shot putters from 15 nations competed. The maximum number of athletes per nation was 4. The event was won by Bud Houser of the United States, the nation's sixth victory in the men's shot put (having won every Games except 1920). Glenn Hartranft took silver and Ralph Hills took bronze to complete the Americans' fourth medal sweep in the event.

Background

This was the seventh appearance of the event, which is one of 12 athletics events to have been held at every Summer Olympics. Returning finalists from the 1920 Games were gold medalist Ville Pörhölä and silver medalist Elmer Niklander of Finland and sixth-place finisher Harald Tammer of Estonia. Glenn Hartranft of the United States was the favorite. 1924 Olympic discus champion Bud Houser had beaten Hartranft in the shot put at the 1924 AAU championships, however, and was a serious contender.

Brazil, Ireland, Latvia, Mexico, and Yugoslavia made their debut in the men's shot put. The United States appeared for the seventh time, the only nation to have competed in all Olympic shot put competitions to date.

Competition format

The competition continued to use the two-round format used in 1900 and since 1908, with results carrying over between rounds. Each athlete received three throws in the qualifying round. The top six men advanced to the final, where they received an additional three throws. The best result, qualifying or final, counted.

Records

These were the standing world and Olympic records (in metres) prior to the 1924 Summer Olympics.

No new world or Olympic records were set during the competition.

Schedule

Results

The best six shot putters, all three groups counted together, qualified for the final. The throwing order and the throwing series are not available.

The final was held on the same day. Only two competitors were able to improve their qualification width. Glenn Hartranft jumped from a fourth rank to the silver medal.

References

Sources
 Official Report
 

Men's shot put
Shot put at the Olympics